The Alabama Warrior Railway  is a terminal railroad in Birmingham, Alabama. The railroad operates within the confines of Walter Industries in North Birmingham. It began operations on August 7, 2009, and is owned and operated by Watco.

History 
The ABWR operates  of railroad. Its route dates back to the Marylee Railroad, which was founded in 1895. The Jefferson Warrior Railroad had operated it since 1985. The ABWR began operating on August 7, 2009. The railroad hauls approximately 9,000 carloads annually and interchanges with CSX, Norfolk Southern and BNSF. On June 24, 2014, Caleb Bankston, a former contestant on reality series Survivor: Blood vs. Water and employee of the railroad, was killed by a derailment in Birmingham.

References

External links
 

Alabama railroads
Switching and terminal railroads
Watco
Railway companies established in 2009
2009 establishments in Alabama
American companies established in 2009